Imatran Ketterä is an ice hockey club based in Imatra, Finland. Ketterä plays in the Finnish second-tier league, Mestis, during the 2022–23 season. 

Ketterä has played in Mestis since 2017 and has won the championship three times (2019, 2021, 2022). With the 2020 playoffs being cancelled due to COVID-19, Ketterä has been the defending champion of Mestis for four years.

Honours

Champions 

  Mestis (3): 2018–19, 2020–21, 2021–22
  Suomi-sarja (2): 2008–09, 2016–17
  Finnish Cup (3): 2018, 2019, 2021

Runners-up 

  Suomi-sarja (1): 2015-16

Notable players 
  Petteri Nokelainen
  Keith Gretzky
  Petteri Sihvonen
  Joni Yli-Torkko
  Olli Sipiläinen
  Brian Baxter Arroyo Lopez
  Steve Peters
  Heikki Mälkiä
  Pasi Nurminen
  Jussi Markkanen
  Gary Prior
  Björn Robert Sigurdarson
  Michael Messner

References 

Kettera
Ice hockey teams in Finland